Vítězslav Svozil (born 9 April 1933) is a Czech former swimmer. He competed in the men's 200 metre breaststroke at the 1960 Summer Olympics.

References

1933 births
Living people
Czech male swimmers
Olympic swimmers of Czechoslovakia
Swimmers at the 1960 Summer Olympics
Sportspeople from Olomouc
Male breaststroke swimmers